Roman Knoll may refer to:
Roman Knoll (politician), Polish politician and diplomat
 Roman Knoll (Antarctica), geographical feature in Graham Land, Antarctica